Andersonglossum occidentale is a species of flowering plant in the borage family known by the common name western hound's tongue.

It is native to Oregon and northern California, where it is a resident of the coniferous understory, including in the Cascade Range, Klamath Mountains, and the Sierra Nevada.

Description
It is a perennial plant with hairy stems which may approach half a meter in height. It has rough, hairy leaves up to 15 centimeters long and four wide with winged petioles. From the top of the leafy stem appears an inflorescence of tube-shaped reddish-purple flowers, each about a centimeter long. The fruits are bumpy, bristly nutlets attached to each other in clusters of four.

References

Jepson Manual Treatment (TJM93) of Cynoglossum occidentale
CalPhotos: Cynoglossum occidentale

Boraginoideae
Flora of California
Flora of Oregon
Plants described in 1874
Flora without expected TNC conservation status